Midnighters may refer to:

The Midnighters, a rhythm and blues group from the 1950s, led by Hank Ballard
Thee Midniters, a Chicano rock group from the 1960s
The Midnighters trilogy, a novel series written by Scott Westerfeld
Midnighters, a fictional intelligence organization from Scott Lynch's Gentleman Bastard novel series
Midnighters (film), a 2017 American thriller film
Midnighter, a fictional comic book superhero
Midnighter (2006 comic book), published by Wildstorm
Midnighter (2015 comic book), published by DC Comics